Robert Edward Brown  (born 25 December 1947) is a Scottish Liberal Democrat politician. He was a Member of the Scottish Parliament (MSP) for the Glasgow region from 1999 to 2011.

Career
A graduate of University of Aberdeen, he was Depute Procurator Fiscal of Dumbarton 1972−1974 and has since been a partner and consultant with a Glasgow firm of solicitors. He was a Glasgow City councillor (Liberal) for several years in the 1970s and 1980s, and was Convener of the Scottish Liberal Democrat Policy Committee for much of the 1990s and 2000s. He was first elected to the Scottish Parliament in its first election in 1999.

Following Nicol Stephen's election as party leader and succession as Deputy First Minister of Scotland in 2005, Brown was appointed Deputy Minister for Education and Young People in the Scottish Executive.

He was second on the Liberal Democrat list of candidates for Glasgow region in the 2011 Scottish Parliament election but was unsuccessful when the party failed to gain any list seats.

In May 2012, he was elected as a councillor for the Rutherglen South ward on South Lanarkshire Council, and retained the seat at the 2017 elections; being the only Liberal Democrat representative in the council out of 64 seats. He was an unsuccessful candidate for the Rutherglen and Hamilton West constituency at the 2017 UK general election, losing his deposit after receiving only 4% of the vote.

Brown was appointed Commander of the Order of the British Empire (CBE) in the 2014 New Year Honours for service to Politics. He currently resides in Burnside, in the south of Greater Glasgow.

See also 
List of Scottish Executive Ministerial Teams

References

External links
 
Robert Brown MSP Mini-site and biography on Glasgow Liberal Democrat Website
Robert Brown MSP Profile at site of Scottish Liberal Democrats

1947 births
Living people
Politicians from Newcastle upon Tyne
Scottish Liberal Democrat councillors
Scottish solicitors
Rutherglen
Alumni of the University of Aberdeen
Liberal Democrat MSPs
Members of the Scottish Parliament for Glasgow constituencies
Members of the Scottish Parliament 1999–2003
Members of the Scottish Parliament 2003–2007
Members of the Scottish Parliament 2007–2011
Commanders of the Order of the British Empire
Councillors in Glasgow
Councillors in South Lanarkshire
Scottish Liberal Party councillors